Barauli is a town and a notified area in Gopalganj district  in the state of Bihar, India.

Geography

Demographics
As of the 2011 Census of India, Barauli town had a population of 41,877, of which 20,806 are males while 21,071 are females. Population within the age group of 0 to 6 years was 7,095 which is 16.94% of total population of Barauli town. Barauli had an average literacy rate of 56.31%, lower than the state average of 61.8% with male literacy of 56.86%, and female literacy was 43.14%.

See also 

 Barauli, Bihar (Vidhan Sabha constituency)

References

Cities and towns in Gopalganj district, India